Zé Gonzales (born José Henrique Castanho de Godoy Pinheiro), known by his stage name DJ Zegon, is a DJ and producer of electronic music and hip-hop from São Paulo, Brazil.

He started his career in the 1990s as the band DJ for Planet Hemp, one of the top hip-hop acts in Brazil in the 1990s. In the 2000s, he met and began collaborating with Los Angeles based Squeak E. Clean on the N.A.S.A. project. As of 2012, he formed the bass music group Tropkillaz alongside DJ and Producer Andre Laudz.

Collaborations
Zé has collaborated with a number of notable musicians from various genres: Yeah Yeah Yeahs, John Frusciante, M.I.A., Tom Waits

References

Living people
Brazilian music arrangers
1969 births
People from São Paulo